David Leaf (born April 20, 1952) is a Peabody and WGAW award-winning writer, director, and producer who is best known for his associations with Brian Wilson and the Beach Boys since the late 1970s.

Leaf's 1978 biography The Beach Boys and the California Myth examined the behind-the-scenes tensions and family history that had never been covered before. According to music critic Richie Unterberger, Leaf was "the first author to write extensively, and honestly, about the Beach Boys."

Leaf also wrote the first authorized biography of the Bee Gees.

Since 2010, Leaf has been a professor at the UCLA Herb Alpert School of Music.

See also
 An All-Star Tribute to Brian Wilson
 Beautiful Dreamer: Brian Wilson and the Story of Smile
 Who Is Harry Nilsson (And Why Is Everybody Talkin' About Him)?
 The U.S. vs. John Lennon
 The Night James Brown Saved Boston

References

External links
 
 Harvey Kubernik interviews David Leaf
"The Story and the Storyteller"

1952 births
American non-fiction writers
American film directors
Living people
American publicists